This was the first edition of the tournament.

Roberto Carballés Baena won the title after defeating Pedro Martínez 1–6, 6–3, 6–0 in the final.

Seeds

Draw

Finals

Top half

Bottom half

References
Main Draw
Qualifying Draw

Sánchez-Casal Mapfre Cup - Singles